Women and Birds is a painting by the Catalan artist Joan Miró. In February 2014 it was expected to be sold at auction for between $6.5m and $11.5m, but the auction was cancelled.

References

Paintings by Joan Miró
Birds in art